The Old Lake County Courthouse (constructed in 1922) is a historic courthouse in Tavares, Florida, located at 315 West Main Street. On September 25, 1998, it was added to the U.S. National Register of Historic Places.

The Lake County Historical Museum is located on the first floor of the courthouse. The museum's exhibits focus on the county's history and cultural heritage.

References

 Lake County listings at National Register of Historic Places
 Florida's Office of Cultural and Historical Programs
 Alachua County listings  (Correct courthouse, but listed under wrong county)
 Lake County Courthouse
 Lake County Courthouse at Florida's Historic Courthouses
 Florida's Historic Courthouses by Hampton Dunn

External links
Lake County Historical Museum - official site

County courthouses in Florida
National Register of Historic Places in Lake County, Florida
Museums in Lake County, Florida
History museums in Florida